The Hackett House, at 2109 1st St. in Napa, California, was listed on the National Register of Historic Places in 1984. It was designed by architect Luther M. Turton and built by carpenter-builder J. W. Hoover.

It is a one-and-a-half-story frame Queen Anne/Eastlake cottage built in 1889 upon a raised cut stone foundation.  It was rehabilitated in 1979, expanding a kitchen to the rear.  It has channel siding.

References

External links

National Register of Historic Places in Napa County, California
Queen Anne architecture in California
Stick-Eastlake architecture in California
Houses completed in 1889